Hugh Gerhardi (5 May 1933 - 12 January 1985) was a South African footballer who played as a defender.

External links
 LFC History profile

1933 births
South African soccer players
Thistle F.C. players
Liverpool F.C. players
1985 deaths
Sportspeople from Johannesburg
Association football defenders
South African expatriate soccer players
Expatriate footballers in England
South African expatriate sportspeople in England